Michael Anthony Munoz (born July 12, 1965), is an American former professional baseball player who pitched in the Major Leagues from 1989 to 2000.

External links

1965 births
Living people
People from Baldwin Park, California
Major League Baseball pitchers
Baseball players from California
Cal Poly Pomona Broncos baseball players
Los Angeles Dodgers players
Detroit Tigers players
Colorado Rockies players
Texas Rangers players
Great Falls Dodgers players
Bakersfield Dodgers players
San Antonio Missions players
Albuquerque Dukes players
Toledo Mud Hens players
Colorado Springs Sky Sox players